The 1998 Election Committee subsector elections were held on 2 April 1998 to form the Election Committee responsible for electing the Chief Executive of Hong Kong as well as 10 seats of the Election Committee constituency in the first Legislative Council election in May 1998. The 800-member Election Committee was formed, consisting of 77 ex-officio members; 40 members nominated by the Religious Subsector; 95 returned uncontested from four subsectors; and 588 returned from 31 subsectors after the subsector elections.

Formation of the Election Committee
A Election Committee was set up under the Annex I of the Hong Kong Basic Law with four sectors, each comprising 200 members of the Election Committee:
 industrial, commercial and financial; 
 the professions; 
 labour, social services and religious; and 
 political, including members of the Provisional Legislative Council, Hong Kong deputies to the National People's Congress, representatives of Hong Kong members of the National Committee of the Chinese People's Political Consultative Conference, and representatives of district-based organisations.

The four sectors are subdivided into 38 subsectors. Members from 35 of the subsectors were returned by election and three subsectors do not require election: the National People's Congress subsector and the Provisional Legislative Council subsector since the Hong Kong deputies to the National People's Congress and the members of the Provisional Legislative Council are ex-officio members of the Election Committee, and the Religious subsector's EC members were returned by way of nomination.

Subsectors of the Election Committee
The 38 Subsectors and the number of the members were:

First Sector:
 Catering (11)
 Commercial (first) (12)
 Commercial (second) (12)
 Employers’ Federation of Hong Kong (11)
 Finance (12)
 Financial services (12)
 Hong Kong Chinese Enterprises Association (11)
 Hotel (11)
 Import and export (12)
 Industrial (first) (12)
 Industrial (second) (12)
 Insurance (12)
 Real estate and construction (12)
 Textiles and garment (12)
 Tourism (12)
 Transport (12)
 Wholesale and retail (12)

Second Sector:
 Accountancy (20)
 Architectural, surveying and planning (20)
 Chinese medicine (20)
 Education (20)
 Engineering (20)
 Health services (20)
 Higher education (20)
 Information technology (20)
 Legal (20)
 Medical (20)

Third Sector:
 Agriculture and fisheries (40)
 Labour (40)
 Religious (40)
 Social welfare	 (40)
 Sports, performing arts, culture and publication (40)

Fourth Sector:
 National People's Congress (36)
 Provisional Legislative Council (60)
 Chinese People's Political Consultative Conference (41)
 Heung Yee Kuk (21)
 Hong Kong and Kowloon Provisional District Boards (21)
 New Territories Provisional District Boards (21)

Nominations
There were total of 1,074 nominations of all the 35 subsectors during the nomination period from 13 March to 20 March 1998 while 1,058 of them validly nominated for the 35 subsectors. The candidates for four of the 35 subsectors were returned uncontested. Since 117 Election Committee members were either ex-officio or nominated by the Religious subsector, and four subsectors returning 95 Election Committee members were uncontested, there were 963 candidates remaining to contesting in 31 subsectors for 588 seats in the EC.

Results
Statistics are generated from the Report on the 1998 Legislative Council Elections.

References

E
E
1998 elections in China
E
April 1998 events in Asia